Mili is a 1975 Indian Hindi-language romantic drama film directed by Hrishikesh Mukherjee. It starred Amitabh Bachchan, Jaya Bachchan and Ashok Kumar. Jaya Bachchan received a Filmfare nomination as Best Actress, the only nomination for the film.  The film was later remade in Telugu in 1976 as Jyothi starring Jayasudha in the title role.

Plot
Mili is a story about a girl who suffers from pernicious anemia, a disease considered untreatable during the period the film was produced. Her lively, inquisitive and cheerful demeanour spreads happiness in everyone's life. She becomes an inspiration to her new neighbour Shekhar who is a depressed alcoholic. With her cheerful ways she changes Shekhar and he falls in love with her, unaware of her ailment. When he learns of it, he thinks of going away as he cannot bear to see her die. A reproach from their neighbour Aruna Irani makes him reconsider his decision. As he loves the girl, he offers to marry her and take her abroad for her treatment. The film begins and ends with a scene of a jet aircraft taking off, ostensibly carrying the couple to Switzerland where they hope to find a cure.

Cast
 Amitabh Bachchan as Shekhar Dayal 
 Jaya Bhaduri as Mili Khanna 
 Ashok Kumar as Mr. Khanna, Mili's father
 Usha Kiran as Sharda Khanna 
 Suresh Chatwal as Ranjeet Khanna
 Shubha Khote as Neighbour 
 Aruna Irani as Runa Singh

Music

Awards

|-
| rowspan="3"|1976
| Amitabh Bachchan
| BFJA Awards for Best Actor (Hindi)
| 
|-
| Jaya Bachchan
| Filmfare Award for Best Actress
| 
|}

References

External links 
 

1975 films
1970s Hindi-language films
1975 romantic drama films
Films directed by Hrishikesh Mukherjee
Films scored by S. D. Burman
Hindi films remade in other languages
Indian romantic drama films